Alayna is a female given name. It may refer to:
Alayna, Producer of the Bobby Bones Show
Alayna Burns (born 1980), Australian cyclist
Alayna Ng, Royal New Zealand Ballet dancer
Alayna Snell, (born 1961) American fencer